Makedonikos Football Club is a Greek professional football club based in Neapoli and most of his fans come from this area, though the club is famous in all westside areas of Thessaloniki.

History
The association was founded in 1928 and the name means 'Macedonian'. At the time of its formation the club's original name was Prosfygiki Enosis (Refugees Union - the founders were Greek refugees who came from Turkey after the 1922 war disaster)  but they were forced to change it in 1936 after the Metaxas government suggestion. The name of the team inspired many regional teams and as a result there are more than twenty Macedonian teams who also use it (Olympiacos and PAOK are also common names for Greek football clubs).

The club's best moments were in the 1940s when the team was struggling for the Greek Championship (1947) but didn't make it and in the 1980s when Makedonikos took part in the Super League (1st Division Championship) (1982–83) and was relegated after a play-out match against Panionios (3-2 final score). Makedonikos still stands out as the only Greek team who managed not to be beaten by Olympiacos (0-0 in Efkarpia and 1-1 in Karaiskakis Stadium). They also managed not to lose a game in Efkarpia against PAOK (0-0), Aris (1-0), Iraklis (0-0), AEK (1-0), Panathinaikos (3-0), the most famous clubs of the Greek League. They also made it to the 1980 Greek Cup semi-final where they were eliminated by Kastoria F.C., who finally won the Cup. Makedonikos F.C. was also one of the strongest clubs in the 2nd Division throughout the 1980s, the late-1970s and in the early-1990s. In 2008, they managed to ascend to the soccer league, after fourteen years of absence in the national leagues, with Marcelo Zuleta as technical director. As for 2016, the club won the EPSM Cup by winning 2-1 in the final at Toumba Stadium and were also champions of the EPSM A1 Division having lost only twice. In the play-off match against Apollon Paralimnio (which was crucial for both teams for their promotion), chairman Pavlos Andronis withdraw the team due to bad arbitration, and so the team lost the chance to promote. However, during the 2016-17 season, Makedonikos finished on top of the league and promoted to the Third National Division (Gamma Ethniki) having won the play-off match against Olympiacos Kimina (3-1).

Many great Greek football players joined Makedonikos F.C. over the years. Giorgos Karamihalos, Fanis Tountziaris, Nikos Sakellaridis made their name wearing the green shirt of Makedonikos while other famous footballers played in Efkarpia sometime in their career. Giannis Damanakis, Giannis Gounaris, Christos Giannakoulas, Kostas Iliadis, Theodoros Apostolidis, Thanasis Beltsos, Grigoris Fanaras, Panagiotis Kermanidis, Kostas Drambis, Kostas Tsironis, Giorgos Koulakiotis, Takis Nikoloudis, Christos Terzanidis, Giorgos Polyzoidis, Michalis Iordanidis are some of them.

Players

Current squad

Honours

 Second Division: 1
 1981–82
 Third Division: 2
 1976–77, 1987–88
 Fourth Division: 1
 2007–08
Regional
EPSM Championship: 9
1946–47, 1960–61, 1961–62, 1976–76, 1976–77, 1997–98, 2001–02, 2015–16, 2016–17
EPSM Cup: 1
2015–16

References

External links
Official website

 
Association football clubs established in 1928
Sports clubs in Thessaloniki
Football clubs in Central Macedonia
1928 establishments in Greece
Gamma Ethniki clubs

el:Α.Π.Σ. Μακεδονικός Νεάπολης